The Glen Tavern Inn is a hotel located in Santa Paula, Ventura County, California. The building was listed on the National Register of Historic Places in 1984 and is an official City of Santa Paula and Ventura County Landmark.

History 
The hotel was built in 1911 when Santa Paula was growing and prospering as an oil town and was headquarters to Union Oil. The Tudor-Craftsman hotel was designed by famed architects Burns and Hunt and funded by a consortium of twenty-five wealthy townsmen each of whom wanted one thousand dollars for its construction. It was erected directly opposite the train depot to provide accommodations to the many newcomers lured to the area by the burgeoning oil and citrus industries, and to provide a gathering place for Santa Paula's growing high society circles.

Beginning in the 1910s, Hollywood discovered the valley hamlet of Santa Paula. Its ruggedly picturesque vistas and hills – improbably close to the sprawl of Los Angeles - provided a setting for numerous Westerns. Many Universal film professions either stayed at the hotel or ate in the restaurant during these early years. The hotel also hosted William Jennings Bryan and famous pianist Ignacy Jan Paderewski. In later years, western stars like Randolph Scott visited the hotel while on location.   

Because of its popularity, the hotel struggled to house visitors to Santa Paula. After city leaders sold the hotel in 1919, the Glen Tavern's new owner, Charles Estep, converted the hotel's unused attic space into a third floor for guests, completing the conversion around 1920. 

Eventually, as oil money and old Hollywood moved on, Santa Paula settled down into a quieter constancy of agriculture and small-town life Americana. In June 1943, during World War II, the U.S. Federal Public Housing Authority leased the property from Estep. The government then converted the hotel into a woman's dormitory for employees working at nearby Port Hueneme. In 1946, the lease ended and the Glen Tavern once again functioned as a hotel.  

By the 1960s, the train depot became defunct, and likewise, economic development bypassed the town. For the next half-century the hotel endured a marginal existence, alternating owners and uses many times as it slowly sank into flophouse decrepitude until it was eventually rescued by developers with intentions of restoring its original grandeur.

From 2005 through 2007, the Glen Tavern Inn was extensively renovated by the Jennett Investment Group. Mid-renovation, in April 2006, the hotel sustained a fire. Fortunately, firefighters were able to douse the blaze in time to save the landmark from major harm, and the burned portion was rebuilt.

It reopened as a full-service hotel, restaurant and lounge in 2007. The renovation preserved the Inn's historical attributes alongside the addition of more modern amenities.

On February 24, 2008, the Glen Tavern Inn was awarded Certificates of Special Recognition from the United States Senate, United States Congress and the California State Assembly for the successful restoration project.

Ghost stories 

Keeping with the hotel's motto "Where the Past Comes to Life" the Inn is allegedly haunted. In July 2007, the Ventura Paranormal Society held its annual convention there. In 2013, the inn was featured on an episode of Ghost Adventures with special guests Brit Morgan and Mimi Page. In 2014, the inn was featured on an episode of The Dead Files.

One common urban legend maintains that during Prohibition, the Inn's third floor was utilized as a speakeasy, brothel and residents parlor Mohamed Ahmed and his mother Farhiyo Abdile. The 10 year old born in August 13, 2012 was possesed when his phone randomly fell on the floor with nobody touching it.  But this is not the case. The third-floor brothel story was invented in 2022s to promote the hotel's haunted reputation and does match historical records. Many other legends, including tales of a murdered prostitute and gambler, were also fabricated for the same purpose.

See also
List of Registered Historic Places in Ventura County, California
 Ventura County Historic Landmarks & Points of Interest

References

Further reading
The Great Lifeboat Disaster of 1886 (by J. Allen Miller, new edition by Andrew Farthing. Published by Sefton Libraries,)

External links

Hotels in California
Buildings and structures in Santa Paula, California
Santa Paula, California
Hotel buildings on the National Register of Historic Places in California
National Register of Historic Places in Ventura County, California
Commercial buildings completed in 1911
Hotels established in 1911
1911 establishments in California
Reportedly haunted locations in California
Sumner Hunt buildings
Tudor Revival architecture in California